Sheikh Khalid bin Zayed Al Nahyan is an Emirati member of the Al Nahyan ruling family of the emirate of Abu Dhabi.

The son of Sultan bin Zayed bin Sultan Al Nahyan, Sheikh Khalid graduated from the American University of Sharjah (BSc, International Relations). He completed an MA by Research at Durham University (Ustinov College) in 2008. He earned his PhD from the Department of War Studies at King's College London in 2014. He is the author of The Three Islands - mapping the UAE-Iran dispute, a book detailing the Seizure of Abu Musa and the Greater and Lesser Tunbs which was published in 2013.

References

Living people
American University of Sharjah alumni
Alumni of King's College London
Alumni of Ustinov College, Durham
Khalid bin Sultan bin Zayed
Year of birth missing (living people)